Agh Gol (also Romanized as Āgh Gol) is a village in Chaybasar-e Shomali Rural District, Bazargan District, Maku County, West Azerbaijan Province, Iran. At the 2006 census, its population was 1,034, in 182 families.

References 

Tageo

Populated places in Maku County